Maximiliano Ortíz (born 11 October 1989) is a Bolivian professional footballer who plays for Nacional Potosi  in the Bolivian Primera División.

Career
From Tucumán, Argentina but with Bolivian parents, Ortiz can play in defence and attack.
In 2015 Ortiz left Nacional Potosi to join Club San José.

International career
On 24 March 2018, Ortiz player for the Bolivia national football team in a 1-1 draw against the Curacao national football team.

References

1989 births
Living people
Bolivian footballers
Association football defenders
Bolivia international footballers
Argentine footballers
Naturalized citizens of Bolivia
Argentine expatriate footballers
Expatriate footballers in Bolivia
Instituto footballers
Racing de Córdoba footballers
Nacional Potosí players
Club San José players
Club Blooming players
The Strongest players
Footballers from Córdoba, Argentina